The Conifer Junction Schoolhouse, at 26951 Barkley Road in Conifer, Colorado, was listed on the National Register of Historic Places in 2014.

It was built in 1923.

It later served as a pre-school for many years.

References

Schools in Colorado
National Register of Historic Places in Jefferson County, Colorado
School buildings completed in 1923
School buildings on the National Register of Historic Places in Colorado
1923 establishments in Colorado